Kishkenekol (Kışkeneköl,  "small lake") is the administrative center of Ualikhanov District, North Kazakhstan Region. Its population is about 6,000 people. Kishkenekol is also known as Kzyltu, which was its old name during the Soviet Union era. Initially, as the town was settled, it was given the name of Kishkenekol. The name was given because of the lake adjacent to the town.

Populated places in North Kazakhstan Region